Waters may refer to:

A body of water
Territorial waters
Waters (name), a surname
Waters (band), an American band
Waters (magazine), a financial technology magazine
Waters Corporation, an American corporation that produces products for chromatography
Waters, an official magazine of Vancouver Aquarium
Waters v. Churchill, a 1994 U.S. Supreme Court decision on the free-speech rights of public employees at work
USS Waters (DD-115), a destroyer in the U.S. Navy
USNS Waters (T-AGS-45), a U.S. Navy Vessel
Waters, Michigan, an unincorporated community

See also
 Water (disambiguation)
 Watters (disambiguation)